Weil, Weill, and Weyl are related German and German-Jewish surnames.

Notable bearers of the surnames include:

Weil 
 Adolf Weil (physician) (or Adolph Weill) (1848–1916), German physician
 Adolf Weil (motorcyclist) (1938–2011), German motocross racer
 A. Leo Weil (1858–1938), American lawyer
 André Weil (1906–1998), French mathematician; brother of Simone
 Andrew Weil (born 1942), American physician
 Barbara Weil (1933–2018), American artist
 Baruch Schleisinger Weil (1802–1893), French-American farmer, real estate broker and politician
 Connor Weil, American actor
 Cynthia Weil (born 1940), American songwriter
 Edward Weil (1872–1932), American lawyer and politician
Elizabeth Weil, American journalist and nonfiction writer
 Éric Weil (1904–1977), French-German philosopher
 Felix Weil (1898–1975), wealthy Argentinean who funded the Institute for Social Research (the "Frankfurt School")
 Gert Weil (born 1960), Chilean shot putter
 Gustav Weil (1808–1889), German Orientalist 
 Guy Weill (1914–2006), Swiss-born American art collector
 Hanna Weil (1921–2011), German-born British artist
 Henri Weil (1818–1909), German-born French philologist
 Hermann Wilhelm Weil (1876–1949), American opera singer
 Irwin Weil (born 1928), American professor of Russian literature, son of Sidney Weil
 Jacob Weil (died before 1456), German rabbi and Talmudist
 Jacob Weil (writer) (1792–1864), German educator and writer
 Jiří Weil (1900–1959), Czech novelist 
 Jo Weil (born 1977), German actor
 Joe Weil (born 1958), American poet
 Joseph Weil (born 1875), American confidence man
 Kathleen Weil, Quebec politician
 Léon Weil (1896–2006), French World War I veteran
 Liza Weil (born 1977), American actress
 Mark Weil (1952–2007), Soviet and Uzbek theatre director
 Nathaniel Weil (1687–1769), German rabbi and Talmudist
 Prosper Weil (1926–2018), French jurist
 Olga Strashun Weil (1903–1963), American amateur tennis player and golfer
 Rachel Judith Weil (born ca 1959), American historian
 Raoul Weil (born 1959), Swiss bank executive
 Robert Schoenhof Weil (1919–2016), American businessman and philanthropist
 Sage Weil (born 1978), American computer scientist 
 Shraga Weil (1918–2009), Czech-Israeli artist
 Sidney Weil (1891–1966), American business executive and onetime owner of the Cincinnati Reds
 Simone Weil (1909–1943), French philosopher; sister of André
 Stephan Weil (born 1958), German politician
 Terence Weil (1921–1995), British cellist
 Wendy Weinberg Weil (born 1958), American Olympic medalist swimmer

Weill 
 Al Weill (1893–1969), French-American boxing manager
Alain Weill, French business executive
 Alain Weill (art critic) (born 1946), French art critic, expert in graphic design and advertising
 Claudia Weill, American film director
Claudie Weill (1945–2018), French historian
 Étienne Weill-Raynal (1887–1982), French politician
 Gus Weill (born 1933), American political consultant and author
 Kurt Weill (1900–1950), German-American composer
 Michel David-Weill (born 1932), American investment banker; son of Pierre
 Michel Weill (1914–2001), French architect
 Peter Weill (born ca 1955), Australian computer scientist
 Pierre David-Weill (1900–1975), French investment banker; father of Michel
 Raymond Henry Weill (1913–2003), American philatelist; brother of Roger
 Roger G. Weill (1909–1991), American philatelist; brother of Raymond
 Sanford I. Weill (born 1933), American financier

Weyl 
 Glen Weyl (born 1985) American economist and researcher
 Helene Weyl (1893-1948), German writer and translator
 Hermann Weyl (1885-1955), German mathematician
 Nathaniel Weyl (1910–2005) American economist and author

 Richard Weyl (1912-1988) German geologist

See also 
 Weill (disambiguation)
 Weil (disambiguation)

References

German-language surnames
Jewish surnames
Levite surnames
Yiddish-language surnames

de:Weil
ru:Вейль